Cyllecoris marginatus is a species of bugs in Miridae family that is endemic to Greece.

References

Insects described in 1870
Endemic fauna of Greece
Hemiptera of Europe
Orthotylini